Emily Muteti (born 14 June 1998) is a Kenyan swimmer. She competed in the women's 100 metre butterfly event at the 2017 World Aquatics Championships. In 2019, she represented Kenya at the 2019 African Games held in Rabat, Morocco and she won the bronze medal in the women's 4 × 100 metre medley relay.

She competed in the women's 50 metre freestyle event at the 2020 Summer Olympics.

She competes at the collegiate level for Grand Canyon University.

References

External links
 

1998 births
Living people
Kenyan female swimmers
Commonwealth Games competitors for Kenya
Swimmers at the 2018 Commonwealth Games
Female butterfly swimmers
African Games bronze medalists for Kenya
Swimmers at the 2015 African Games
Swimmers at the 2019 African Games
Swimmers at the 2020 Summer Olympics
Olympic swimmers of Kenya

Sportspeople from Mombasa
Grand Canyon Antelopes
African Games medalists in swimming
20th-century Kenyan women
21st-century Kenyan women
Swimmers at the 2022 Commonwealth Games
Competitors at the 2019 Summer Universiade